Mareyada Haadu is a 1981 Kannada-language romance film directed and written by R. N. Jayagopal and produced by K. S. Sacchidananda. The film stars Ananth Nag, Manjula and Leelavathi.

The film was a musical hit with the songs composed by G. K. Venkatesh considered evergreen hits. The cinematographer R. N. K. Prasad was awarded with the Karnataka State Film Award for Best Cinematographer for this film.

Cast 
 Ananth Nag 
 Manjula
 Sundar Krishna Urs
 Leelavathi 
 Shivaram
 Rajashankar
 Dingri Nagaraj
 Chethan Ramarao
 Venkatarao

Soundtrack 
The music was composed by G. K. Venkatesh, with lyrics by R. N. Jayagopal. The songs composed for the film, especially "Bhuvaneshwariya" , which was a record 8 min song which was based on raga Mohana Kalyani and "Sukhada Swapna Gaana", both rendered by S. Janaki, were received extremely well and considered as evergreen songs.

Awards
 Karnataka State Film Award for Best Cinematographer - R. N. K. Prasad

References 

1981 films
1980s Kannada-language films
Indian romance films
1980s romance films
Films scored by G. K. Venkatesh